The LL postcode area, also known as the Llandudno postcode area, is a group of 67 postcode districts, within 62 post towns. These cover the majority of north Wales, plus a very small part of west Wales and the English county of Shropshire. The districts start at LL11 so as to avoid confusion with Liverpool postcodes (LL1-9 would resemble L11-19).



Post towns
The post towns are: 
 
 Aberdyfi
 Abergele
 Amlwch
 Arthog
 Bala
 Bangor
 Barmouth
 Beaumaris
 Benllech
 Betws-y-Coed
 Blaenau Ffestiniog
 Bodorgan
 Brynteg
 Caernarfon
 Cemaes Bay
 Colwyn Bay
 Conwy
 Corwen
 Criccieth
 Denbigh
 Dolgellau
 Dolwyddelan
 Dulas
 Dyffryn Ardudwy
 Fairbourne
 Gaerwen
 Garndolbenmaen
 Harlech
 Holyhead
 Llanbedr
 Llanbedrgoch
 Llandudno
 Llandudno Junction
 Llanerchymedd
 Llanfairfechan
 Llanfairpwllgwyngyll
 Llangefni
 Llangollen
 Llanrwst
 Llwyngwril
 Marianglas
 Menai Bridge
 Moelfre
 Penmaenmawr
 Penrhyndeudraeth
 Pentraeth
 Penysarn
 Porthmadog
 Prestatyn
 Pwllheli
 Rhosgoch
 Rhosneigr
 Rhyl
 Ruthin
 St Asaph
 Talsarnau
 Talybont
 Towyn
 Trefriw
 Ty Croes
 Tyn-y-Gongl
 Tywyn
 Wrexham 
 Y Felinheli

Coverage
The approximate coverage of the postcode districts:

|-
! LL11
| WREXHAM
| Wrexham, Coedpoeth, Llandegla, Minera, Bradley, Gwersyllt, Rhosrobin, Stansty, Brymbo, Bwlchgwyn, Cymau, Ffrith, Llanfynydd, Gwynfryn, Tanyfron, Brynteg
| Denbighshire, Flintshire, Wrexham
|-
! LL12
| WREXHAM
| Wrexham, Caergwrle, Cefn-y-bedd, Cymau, Gresford, Hope, Llay, Marford, Rossett
| Flintshire, Wrexham
|-

! LL13
| WREXHAM
| Wrexham, Abenbury, Bowling Bank, Holt, Llan-y-Pwll, Pentre Maelor, Ridley Wood, Bangor-on-Dee, Gyfelia, Marchwiel, Overton, Penley, Worthenbury, Johnstown
| Wrexham
|-
! LL14
| WREXHAM
| Wrexham, Rhosllanerchrugog, Cefn Mawr, Ponciau, Rhostyllen, Chirk, Ruabon
| Shropshire, Wrexham
|-
! LL15
| RUTHIN
| Ruthin, Bontuchel, Clawddnewydd, Clocaenog, Cyffylliog, Gellifor, Graigfechan, Llanbedr Dyffryn Clwyd, Llanelidan, Llanfair Dyffryn Clwyd, Pwllglas, Rhewl
| Denbighshire
|-
! LL16
| DENBIGH
| Denbigh, Bodfari, Llandyrnog, Llanrhaeadr, Bylchau, Groes, Henllan, Llannefydd, Llansannan, Nantglyn, The Green, Trefnant
| Conwy, Denbighshire
|-
! LL17
| ST. ASAPH
| St Asaph, Allt Goch, Rhuallt, Tremeirchion, Waen
| Conwy, Denbighshire
|-
! LL18
| RHYL
| Rhyl, Bodelwyddan, Cwm Dyserth, Kinmel Bay, Dyserth, Gwaenysgor, Rhuddlan, Trelawnyd
| Conwy, Denbighshire, Flintshire
|-
|-
! style="background:#FFFFFF;"|LL18
| style="background:#FFFFFF;"|ST ASAPH
| style="background:#FFFFFF;"|
| style="background:#FFFFFF;"|non-geographic
|-
! LL19
| PRESTATYN
| Prestatyn, Gronant
| Denbighshire, Flintshire
|-
! LL20
| LLANGOLLEN
| Froncysyllte, Garth, Glyn Ceiriog, Llanarmon Dyffryn Ceiriog, Llwynmawr, Pandy, Pontfadog, Rhewl, Tregeiriog, Trevor, Llangollen, Eglwyseg, Llantysilio
| Denbighshire, Wrexham
|-
! LL21
| CORWEN
| Corwen, Cynwyd, Glan-yr-afon, Glasfryn, Llandrillo, Llangwm, Maerdy, Ty Nant, Betws Gwerfil Goch, Bryneglwys, Carrog, Cerrigydrudion, Clawdd Poncen, Derwen, Glyndyfrdwy, Gwyddelwern, Llanfihangel Glyn Myfyr, Llidiart-y-Parc, Melin-y-Wig
| Conwy, Denbighshire, Gwynedd
|-
! LL22
| ABERGELE
| Abergele, Towyn, Betws Yn Rhos, Gwytherin, Llanddulas, Llanfairtalhaiarn, Llangernyw, Moelfre, Pandy Tudur, Rhyd-y-Foel, Glascoed, St. George
| Denbighshire, Conwy
|-
! LL23
| BALA
| Bala, Llandderfel, Llanfor, Llanuwchllyn, Sarnau
| Gwynedd
|-
! LL24
| BETWS-Y-COED
| Betws-y-Coed, Capel Curig, Cwm Penmachno, Penmachno, Pentre Du, Pentrefoelas, Ysbyty Ifan
| Conwy
|-
! LL25
| DOLWYDDELAN
| Dolwyddelan
| Conwy
|-
! LL26
| LLANRWST
| Llanrwst, Capel Garmon, Llanddoged, Melin-y-Coed, Maenan
| Conwy
|-
! LL27
| TREFRIW
| Trefriw
| Conwy
|-
! LL28
| COLWYN BAY
| Colwyn Bay, Rhos-on-Sea, Eglwysbach, Glan Conwy, Mochdre, Tal-y-Cafn
| Conwy
|-
! LL29
| COLWYN BAY
| Colwyn Bay, Llanelian, Llysfaen, Old Colwyn
| Conwy
|-
! LL30
| LLANDUDNO
| Llanrhos, Llandudno, Penrhyn Bay
| Conwy
|-
!rowspan=2|LL31
| LLANDUDNO JUNCTION
| Glanwydden, Llangwstenin, Llandudno Junction
|rowspan=2|Conwy
|-
| CONWY
| Deganwy
|-
! LL32
| CONWY
| Conwy, Dolgarrog, Groesffordd, Henryd, Rowen, Tal-y-Bont, Tyn-y-Groes
| Conwy
|-
! LL33
| LLANFAIRFECHAN
| Abergwyngregyn, Llanfairfechan
| Conwy, Gwynedd
|-
! LL34
| PENMAENMAWR
| Penmaenmawr, Dwygyfylchi
| Conwy
|-
! LL35
| ABERDYFI / ABERDOVEY
| Aberdyfi
| Gwynedd
|-
! LL36
| TYWYN
| Tywyn, Abergynolwyn, Bryncrug, Llanegryn, Rhoslefain
| Gwynedd
|-
! LL37
| LLWYNGWRIL
| Llwyngwril
| Gwynedd
|-
! LL38
| FAIRBOURNE
| Fairbourne, Friog
| Gwynedd
|-
! LL39
| ARTHOG
| Arthog
| Gwynedd
|-
! LL40
| DOLGELLAU
| Dolgellau, Brithdir, Drws Y Nant, Ganllwyd, Llanelltyd, Llanfachreth, Rhydymain, Tabor
| Gwynedd
|-
! LL41
| BLAENAU FFESTINIOG
| Blaenau Ffestiniog, Talwaenydd, Ffestiniog, Gellilydan, Maentwrog, Manod, Trawsfynydd
| Gwynedd
|-
! LL42
| BARMOUTH
| Barmouth, Llanaber
| Gwynedd
|-
! LL43
| TALYBONT
| Talybont
| Gwynedd
|-
! LL44
| DYFFRYN ARDUDWY
| Dyffryn Ardudwy
| Gwynedd
|-
! LL45
| LLANBEDR
| Llanbedr
| Gwynedd
|-
! LL46
| HARLECH
| Harlech, Llanfair
| Gwynedd
|-
! LL47
| TALSARNAU
| Talsarnau, Soar, Ynys
| Gwynedd
|-
! LL48
| PENRHYNDEUDRAETH
| Penrhyndeudraeth, Llanfrothen, Minffordd
| Gwynedd
|-
! LL49
| PORTHMADOG
| Porthmadog, Borth-y-Gest, Morfa Bychan, Penmorfa, Prenteg, Tremadog
| Gwynedd
|-
! LL51
| GARNDOLBENMAEN
| Garndolbenmaen
| Gwynedd
|-
! LL52
| CRICCIETH
| Criccieth, Llanystumdwy, Pentrefelin, Rhoslan
| Gwynedd
|-
! LL53
| PWLLHELI
| Pwllheli, Efailnewydd, Llannor, Abererch, Chwilog, Llithfaen, Nefyn, Pistyll, Plas Gwyn, Y Ffor, Abersoch, Bwlchtocyn, Llanbedrog, Mynytho, Penrhos, Rhydyclafdy, Aberdaron, Boduan, Botwnnog, Edern, Morfa Nefyn, Sarn, Tudweiliog
| Gwynedd
|-
! LL54
| CAERNARFON
| Caernarfon, Clynnogfawr, Llanaelhaearn, Llandwrog, Pontllyfni, Saron, Trefor, Llanllyfni, Aberdesach, Nantlle, Penygroes, Rhyd Ddu, Talysarn, Bontnewydd, Carmel, Dinas, Groeslon, Rhosgadfan, Rhostryfan
| Gwynedd
|-
! LL55
| CAERNARFON
| Caernarfon, Bethel (Gwynedd), Bontnewydd, Caeathro, Brynrefail, Clwt-y-Bont, Deiniolen, Penisarwaun, Beddgelert, Ceunant, Cwm-y-glo, Llanberis, Llanrug, Nant Gwynant, Nant Peris, Waunfawr
| Gwynedd
|-
! LL56
| Y FELINHELI
| Y Felinheli
| Gwynedd
|-
! LL57
| BANGOR
| Bangor, Llanllechid, Rachub, Talybont, Bethesda, Glasinfryn, Llandygai, Mynydd Llandygai, Rhiwlas, Tregarth
| Gwynedd
|-
! LL58
| BEAUMARIS
| Beaumaris, Llanddona, Llanfaes, Llangoed, Penmon
| Isle of Anglesey
|-
! LL59
| MENAI BRIDGE
| Menai Bridge, Llandegfan, Llansadwrn
| Isle of Anglesey
|-
! LL60
| GAERWEN
| Gaerwen, Llanddaniel, Llangaffo, Star
| Isle of Anglesey
|-
! LL61
| LLANFAIRPWLLGWYNGYLL
| Llanfairpwllgwyngyll, Brynsiencyn, Dwyran, Newborough, Penmynydd
| Isle of Anglesey
|-
! LL62
| BODORGAN
| Bodorgan, Bethel (Anglesey), Hermon, Llangristiolus, Malltraeth, Trefdraeth
| Isle of Anglesey
|-
! LL63
| TY CROES
| Ty Croes, Aberffraw, Llanfaelog
| Isle of Anglesey
|-
! LL64
| RHOSNEIGR
| Rhosneigr
| Isle of Anglesey
|-
! LL65
| HOLYHEAD
| Holyhead, Trearddur Bay, Four Mile Bridge, Rhoscolyn, Bodedern, Bryngwran, Caergeiliog, Llanynghenedl, Trefor, Valley, Gwalchmai, Llanddeusant, Llanfachraeth, Llanfaethlu, Llanfairynghornwy, Llanrhyddlad, Rhydwyn
| Isle of Anglesey
|-
! LL66
| RHOSGOCH
| Rhosgoch
| Isle of Anglesey
|-
! LL67
| CEMAES BAY
| Cemaes Bay, Tregele
| Isle of Anglesey
|-
! LL68
| AMLWCH
| Amlwch, Bull Bay, Carreglefn, Llanfechell, Rhosybol
| Isle of Anglesey
|-
! LL69
| PENYSARN
| Penysarn
| Isle of Anglesey
|-
! LL70
| DULAS
| Dulas
| Isle of Anglesey
|-
! LL71
| LLANERCHYMEDD
| Llanerchymedd
| Isle of Anglesey
|-
! LL72
| MOELFRE
| Moelfre
| Isle of Anglesey
|-
! LL73
| MARIANGLAS
| Marianglas
| Isle of Anglesey
|-
! LL74
| TYN-Y-GONGL
| Tyn-y-Gongl, Benllech
| Isle of Anglesey
|-
! LL75
| PENTRAETH
| Pentraeth, Red Wharf Bay, Rhoscefnhir
| Isle of Anglesey
|-
! LL76
| LLANBEDRGOCH
| Llanbedrgoch
| Isle of Anglesey
|-
! LL77
| LLANGEFNI
| Bodffordd, Rhostrehwfa, Talwrn, Llangefni
| Isle of Anglesey
|-
|-
! style="background:#FFFFFF;"|LL77
| style="background:#FFFFFF;"|RHOSNEIGR
| style="background:#FFFFFF;"|
| style="background:#FFFFFF;"|Non-geographic
|-
! LL78
| BRYNTEG
| Brynteg
| Isle of Anglesey
|}

Map

See also
Postcode Address File
List of postcode areas in the United Kingdom

References

External links
Royal Mail's Postcode Address File
A quick introduction to Royal Mail's Postcode Address File (PAF)
Using Welsh alternative addresses within Royal Mail's Postcode Address File (PAF)

Postcode areas covering Wales
Llandudno
Colwyn Bay